Ram Singh may refer to:

 Ram Singh I (died 1688), Maharaja of Jaipur
 Ram Singh of Marwar (1730–1772), Raja of Marwar Kingdom
 Ram Singh II (1835–1880), Maharaja of Jaipur
 Ram Singh Kuka (1816–1885), Sikh religious leader
 Ram Singh (architect) (Bhai Ram Singh), Punjab architect, active from 1870s 
 Ram Singh of Bharatpur (1873–1929), Maharaja of princely state Bharatpur
 Ram Singh of Dholpur (1883–1911), Jat ruler of Dholpur
 Ram Singh (Fiji), early 20th-century Fiji Indian businessman
 Ram Singh (cricketer), Indian cricketer who played for Gwalior in 1940s
 Ram Badan Singh, Indian agricultural scientist
 Ram Raja Prasad Singh (1936–2012), Nepalese politician
 Ram Singh, one of the accused in the 2012 Delhi gang rape case
 Ram Singh, character in Class
Ram Singh (murderer), one of the rapists and murderers of the 2012 Delhi gang rape and murder

See also
 Thakur Ram Singh (disambiguation)